The Arab Chamber of Commerce and Industry (ARABCCI) or (ArabCham) in Hong Kong was established in 2006 to promote commercial ties between Hong Kong and Greater China with the Arab world. The Arab Chamber of Commerce is a not for profit organisation, The President is Edwin Hitti.

Activities

Shariah Advisory Council

The Arab Chamber established the first Shariah Advisory Council in Hong Kong, made up of experts in the Islamic code of law. It was established because of the great of Shariah compliance of banking services, financial products, and commercial establishments requiring compliance supervision and regulation, and the lack of services that was provided in Hong Kong and China. The Shariah Advisory Council, established by The Chamber, filled that gap and to this day has provided council and regulation for many establishments throughout Hong Kong and China.

Hong Kong Islamic Index
The HK Islamic Index (HKII), was established in 2007 by the Chamber to support Hong Kong's ambitions to develop into a Shariah compliant, Islamic banking and financial centre and was the first time a chamber of commerce had taken the initiative to create its own equity index. Reuters, Bloomberg, and Quamnet have been contracted to disseminate the HK Islamic Index. The HKII comprises 78 companies listed on the Hong Kong Stock Exchange, with 39 each from Hong Kong and mainland China. The Hong Kong Islamic Index was valued at HK$1,419 as of 20 June 2011. Stocks under the index are listed from the Real Estate, Transportation, Information Technology, Industrial Goods, Utilities, Energy, Material, Telecommunications, or Consumer Goods sectors.

Amwal Credit Union

The Arab Chamber of Commerce and Industry recognised that when The Chamber was established there was a lack of Islamic Banking in Hong Kong and China. In 2009 it established the Amwal Credit Union, which would provide Shariah compliant, Islamic banking and finance based on the core principles of community and individual responsibility, environmental responsibility, and Islamically permissible banking practices.
 
The Amwal Credit Union is the first Islamic Credit Union in the world and the first licensed Islamic cooperative financial institution in Hong Kong, and the sole Shariah Compliant credit union within the Greater China region.

The Amwal Credit Union is a member of the Credit Union League of Hong Kong, and the Association of Development Financing Institutions in Asia and the Pacific (ADFIAP).

International Islamic Mediation and Arbitration Centre

The International Islamic Mediation & Arbitration Centre (IMAC) is an independent international institution established pursuant to a resolution agreed by the Chamber on 31 July 2008 in Hong Kong and in consultation with The International Chamber of Commerce.

The Centre was established to conduct the following:
 Conducting mediations and arbitrations;
 Promotion of international commercial arbitration;
 Coordinating the activities of, and offering assistance to, existing arbitration institutions in the region;
 Providing assistance to ad hoc arbitrations, including acting as appointing authority, particularly in cases where they are taking place in accordance with the UNCITRAL Rules;
 Providing assistance in the enforcement of arbitral awards;
 Providing assistance in the settlement of disputes.

With these goals in mind the Centre has held training courses on Shariah and arbitration for members of the judicial sector in Hong Kong and China.

The Mosque Building Fund

The Mosque Building Fund (MBF) is a charitable building fund established by The Arab Chamber of Commerce and Industry, in 2008, to collect donations and provide funding in Hong Kong to build mosques, community centres, and other public facilities for the Islamic community. Donations, called Zakat, are collected from individuals or institutions. The payment of a Zakat is mandatory under one of the five pillars of Islam. With currently 175,000 Muslims in Hong Kong there is a great need of services specifically designed for their religion.

HK Institute of Islamic Studies

The Hong Kong Institute of Islamic Studies (HKIS) was established by The Arab Chamber of Commerce and Industry in 2008 and offers educational programs in Islamic Law (Shariah), Islamic Finance and Banking, and Islamic Insurance (Takaful). Programs are offered in co-operation with the Institute of Professional Education and Knowledge of Hong Kong.

Support
The establishment of the Chamber and its other organisations have been supported by many organisations:
 Hong Kong SAR Government 
 Ministry of Commerce of the People's Republic of China
 General Union of Chambers of Commerce, Industry & Agriculture for Arab Countries (GUCCIAAC) 
 Union of Arab Banks (UAB) 
 Hong Kong Stock Exchange (HKEx) 
 Islamic Corporation for Insurance of Investments & Export Credits (ICIEC) 
 United Muslim Association of Hong Kong (UMAH) 
 Islamic Chamber of Commerce & Industry (ICCI) 
 League of Arab States (Arab League) 
 Islamic Financial Services Board (IFSB)

Affiliations
The Arab Chamber of Commerce and Industry is a member of the Islamic Financial Services Board (IFSB), ICC- World Chambers Network (WCN), World Association of Non-Governmental Organizations (WANGO), and a subscriber to the World Bank- Civil Society Organization.

References

External links
 

2006 establishments in Hong Kong
Arab diaspora in Asia
Credit unions of China
Islamic banking
Islamic organisations based in Hong Kong
Islamic studies